Daniel Edward O'Leary (born September 1, 1977) is a former American football long snapper and tight end. He played professionally for the Buffalo Bills, New York Giants and Pittsburgh Steelers of the National Football League (NFL).  He played college football at the University of Notre Dame and was drafted in the sixth round of the 2001 NFL Draft.

References

External links
NFL.com player page
Dan O'Leary Pro Football Reference

1977 births
Living people
Players of American football from Cleveland
American football tight ends
Notre Dame Fighting Irish football players
Buffalo Bills players
New York Giants players
Pittsburgh Steelers players